The Fabulous Palm Springs Follies was a Ziegfeld Follies style dance and musical review show that played at the historic Plaza Theatre in Palm Springs, California, United States, seasonally from November to mid-May. The Follies was founded in 1990 by Riff Markowitz and Mary Jardin. Impresario Markowitz  also served as the show's managing director and emcee. The show was often credited with helping to revitalize and maintain the downtown area by bringing in patrons from around the globe. The Follies was unique in that it only featured performers 55 and older and holds Guinness World Records for this claim to fame. It was the subject of a short documentary titled Still Kicking: The Fabulous Palm Springs Follies which was nominated at the 70th Academy Awards for Best Short Subject Documentary. A segment that aired on Seattle television station KOMO-TV that featured the Follies received an Emmy in 1997.  The shows attracted approximately 170,000 attendees yearly. On June 5, 2013, co-founders Markowitz and Jardin announced they would close the Follies on May 18, 2014.



Performers
The Follies had a cast of both featured and guest performers.

Featured Follies performers included:
 Guinness Book of Records "World's Oldest Still Performing Showgirl" (at age 87) Beverly Allen
 Original Broadway West Side Story cast member Hank Brunjes
 Actor, singer, dancer, writer and choreographer Leonard Crofoot
 Broadway musical Dreamgirls cast member Stephanie Eley
 Dancer Randy Doney, who performed with Mitzi Gaynor
 Popular singer Gogi Grant
 Dancer and showgirl Dorothy Kloss
 Bud and James Mercer, long time vaudeville performers and musicians
 Sitcom Blansky's Beauties cast member Jill Owens
 Broadway and television actress Kit Smythe
 Dancer, skater, entertainer Lou De Grado
 Dancer and former Radio City Rockette Ann Murphy
 Legendary dancer, choreographer and actress Sylvia Lewis

Guest performers (headliners) included:
 Brad Cummings and Rex – a comedic ventriloquist variety act (2011–2012)
 John Davidson – singer and comedian (2011–12)
 The Diamonds – a Canadian Doo-Wop quartet (2011–12)
 Maureen McGovern – singer and Broadway actress (2011–12)

Headliners included:
 Anna Maria Alberghetti – operatic singer and actress
 Kaye Ballard – actress, comedian and singer
 The Four Aces – male pop music quartet
 Buddy Greco and spouse Lezlie Anders – singer and pianist; singer
 Howard Keel – actor and singer
 Frankie Laine – singer, songwriter and actor
 Peggy March – pop singer
 Peter Marshall – television and radio personality, actor and singer
 Barbara McNair – singer and actress
 The Mills Brothers – jazz and pop vocal quartet
 The Modernaires – vocal group
 Donald O'Connor – dancer, singer and actor
 Trina Parks – actress, vocalist, choreographer, and dancer; known for playing "Thumper" in Diamonds are Forever
 Kay Starr – pop and jazz singer
 Ralph Young – of singing team Sandler and Young

Production
Musician Johnny Harris served as the conductor for the entire run of the show.

Connie Furr Soloman served as the primary costume designer for seasons 11–16.

References

External links
 The Fabulous Palm Springs Follies: Legacy Site
 
 

Theatre companies in California
Tourist attractions in Palm Springs, California
La Plaza, Palm Springs